INS Mormugao is the second ship of the  stealth guided-missile destroyers of the Indian Navy. She was built at Mazagon Dock Limited (MDL), and was launched on 17 September 2016. The ship was commissioned on 18 December 2022.

Construction
The keel of Mormugao was laid down on 4 June 2015, and she was launched on 17 September 2016 at Mazagon Dock Limited of Mumbai.

She is named after the port city of  Mormugao in Goa.

Mormugao completed its basin trials on 15 December, 2021 and started its maiden sea trials on 19 December, 2021 commemorating the Goa Liberation Day.

The ship was commissioned on 18 December, 2022.

Gallery

See also

References 

Visakhapatnam-class destroyers
Destroyers of the Indian Navy
Ships built in India
2016 ships